Luanshya is a constituency of the National Assembly of Zambia. The modern constituency covers all but the western parts of Luanshya and the town of Fisenge in Luanshya District of Copperbelt Province. 

The constituency was established in 1941 when Ndola was split into two and originally covered the towns of Luanshya and Mufulira. It was later reconfigured to cover Luanshya and Kansenji and then Luanshya and Kalulushi.

List of MPs

References

Constituencies of the National Assembly of Zambia
1941 establishments in Northern Rhodesia
Constituencies established in 1941